Malacosoma franconicum is a moth of the family Lasiocampidae first described by Michael Denis and Ignaz Schiffermüller in 1775. It is found in central and southern Europe, as well as Armenia.

The wingspan is about 22 mm for males and 36 mm for females. Adults are on wing from June to August.

The larvae feed on Artemisia, Achillea, Plantago, Rumex species.

References

External links

"06745 Malacosoma franconica ([Denis & Schiffermüller, 1775) - Frankfurter Ringelspinner"]. Lepiforum e.V.

Malacosoma
Moths of Europe
Moths of Asia
Moths described in 1775
Taxa named by Michael Denis
Taxa named by Ignaz Schiffermüller